Gretchen Marie Zigante (born October 6, 1964) is an American former soccer player who played as a goalkeeper, making two appearances for the United States women's national team.

Career
During college, Zigante played for the North Carolina Tar Heels, where she was the starting goalkeeper in her senior season of 1986 where the team won the 1986 NCAA Division I Women's Soccer Tournament. She later joined Japanese club Fujita Tendai SC Mercury, where she spent five seasons before retiring.

Zigante made her international debut for the United States on July 9, 1986 against Canada in a play-off for the 1986 North American Cup title (a friendly tournament). The match, which lasted 30 minutes, was won by the U.S 3–0 to win the tournament. Her second and final cap came on July 27, 1990 in a friendly match against Canada.

Zigante holds a U.S. Soccer B coaching license, and previously held an A license. After graduating from college, Zigante began working as an assistant coach for the Colorado College Tigers, where she primarily focused on goalkeeper training. After retiring from her playing career, she started working as a goalkeeping coach in Japan with Shiroki FC Serena for two years. She later returned to the U.S., becoming the head coach of the Cal State San Bernardino Coyotes in 1995, where she won the Coach of the Year award from the California Collegiate Athletic Association. She later served as the assistant for the San Diego State Aztecs, before joining the youth team Sereno Soccer Club where she helped coach, develop youth curriculum, and manage the program. In 2002, she joined as an assistant coach for Cornell Big Red, before leading the team as the interim head coach during the 2006 season. She also founded and coached TC United in Ithaca, New York. In 2018, she became the head coach of Wasatch High School Wasps women's soccer team in Heber City, Utah.

Personal life
Gretchen is married to Nenad "Ziggy" Žigante, a former Croatian footballer and coach born in Yugoslavia. They have two children, with her daughter Susana also playing soccer as a goalkeeper. With eligibility through her father, she is capped to the Croatia national team.

Career statistics

International

Honors
United States
 1986 North American Cup

References

1964 births
Living people
Soccer players from Tacoma, Washington
American women's soccer players
American expatriate women's soccer players
American expatriate sportspeople in Japan
Expatriate women's footballers in Japan
American women's soccer coaches
United States women's international soccer players
Women's association football goalkeepers
North Carolina Tar Heels women's soccer players
Fujita SC Mercury players
Nadeshiko League players